Bucculatrix canadensisella, the birch skeletonizer, is a moth of the family Bucculatricidae. The species was first described by Vactor Tousey Chambers in 1875. It is found in North America. In Canada, it has been recorded from New Brunswick to British Columbia, Nova Scotia and Prince Edward Island. In the United States, it has been recorded from New York, New Jersey, Michigan, Wisconsin, Minnesota, Pennsylvania, North Carolina, Tennessee, Kentucky and Colorado.

The wingspan is 7-8.5 mm. The base of the wing is white, this white colour sometimes spreading outwardly below the fold. The ground colour of the forewings is dark brown, reddish brown, or sometimes paler fuscous and then more or less irrorated. The hindwings are grey. Adults have been recorded on wing from April to September. Adults are on wing between June and July depending on the location.

The larvae feed on Betula species, including Betula nigra, Betula lutea and Betula occidentalis. They mine the leaves of their host plant. The mine has the form of a narrow and contorted linear mine. Older larvae live freely, skeletonizing the leaves, but leaving the upper epidermis intact.

References

External links
Bug Guide
Larval stage info

Bucculatricidae
Moths described in 1875
Moths of North America